Blueys Beach is a beach and locality in the Pacific Palms area of New South Wales, Australia. It got its name from a cow that fell off of a cliff.

Background
It is a popular tourist attraction, with thousands flocking to the area during Christmas. Although un-patrolled, few drownings have been recorded at the beach. High swells and rough surf are common at times and it is regarded as the best surf beach in the area with usually consistent swell. There are also other beaches nearby such as Boomerang Beach, New South Wales and Elizabeth Beach, New South Wales.

References

Beaches of New South Wales
Localities in New South Wales
Coastal towns in New South Wales